Akilah Saidah Kamaria Hughes (born August 31, 1989) is an American writer, comedian, YouTuber, podcaster, and actress. She has been a digital correspondent for MTV, HBO, Fusion TV, and Comedy Central. She began her career on a YouTube channel, "It's Akilah, Obviously!", which has amassed more than 150,000 subscribers. From October 2019 to July 2021, she co-hosted the Crooked Media podcast What a Day, alongside journalist Gideon Resnick.

Early life and education 
Akilah Hughes was born in Florence, Kentucky, where she attended Boone County High School. After graduating from high school, she attended Berea College in Berea, Kentucky, and graduated with a Bachelor of Arts in Broadcasting in 2010.

In 2012, Hughes moved to New York City, New York, and earned an Upright Citizens Brigade scholarship.

Career

YouTube 
On December 2, 2013, Hughes uploaded a comedy video, "Meet Your First Black Girlfriend," answering hypothetical questions from a white boyfriend, and it went viral. She was again recognized for releasing the video "On Intersectionality in Feminism and Pizza", that went viral after being uploaded on April 8, 2015.

On June 30, 2016, Hughes created a petition on Change.org titled "Ask Advertisers to Stop Supporting BuzzFeed Video's Idea Theft", which aimed to convince advertisers to stop supporting BuzzFeed Video. In the petition, described by The Washington Post as having gone viral, she argued, "BuzzFeed has been caught repeatedly stealing ideas, jokes, bits, gags, and therefore money from prominent YouTube creators."

In 2017, Hughes sued YouTuber Carl Benjamin (Sargon of Akkad) for copyright infringement after he used a portion of her Hillary Clinton election party footage. In August 2020, the judge, ruling Benjamin's video to be fair use criticism, dismissed the case with prejudice and ordered Hughes to pay Benjamin's legal costs.

In April 2020, Comedy Central's YouTube channel released three sketches starring Hughes and Milana Vayntrub as part of a new digital sketch series called Making Fun With Akilah and Milana.

Television 
Hughes began appearing as herself on web series in 2014, with her first appearances coming in two episodes of mental_floss: The List Show. Between 2014 and 2017, she made various other appearances as herself on web series, including Vlogbrothers in 2015 and Project for Awesome 2016. In 2017, she hosted the first season of GK Now, a daily culinary news show for Genius Kitchen (now Food.com) for Scripps Network.

Her first appearance on a television series came during the U.S. midterm elections of 2018, when HBO aired four episodes of Crooked Media's Pod Save America, with Hughes as a correspondent.

In 2020, Hughes appeared as a panelist on the Syfy television series The Great Debate. That same year, she made her first appearance as an actress on a television series, when she provided the voice of Theresa in an episode of Bob's Burgers titled "Just the Trip".

Writing 
In 2015, Hughes was awarded a fellowship from the Sundance Episodic Story Lab, with a half-hour comedy pilot titled Unlikely, co-written with Lyle Friedman.

Hughes began writing her first book in 2015, after a collaboration with Penguin Group for her Tipsy Book Reviews video series on YouTube led the publisher to offer her a book deal. The book, a collection of essays titled Obviously: Stories From My Timeline, was published on September 24, 2019, by Penguin Random House's Razorbill imprint. The book was included in PopSugar's "The 26 Best New Books You Need to Read This Fall", where writer Brenda Janowitz described the essays as "as hilarious as they are heart-warming." Writing for the Los Angeles Sentinel, Lapacazo Sandoval calls the book "very insightful and very, very funny".

Hosting 
In 2016, Hughes co-moderated the 2016 Brown & Black Democratic Presidential Forum on Fusion TV, alongside Jorge Ramos, Rembert Browne, and Alicia Menendez. Politicians participating in the event were 2016 United States presidential election Democratic candidates Hillary Clinton, Bernie Sanders, and Martin O'Malley.

Beginning in 2019, Hughes became the co-host of a newly launched daily news podcast from Crooked Media titled What a Day, alongside political journalist Gideon Resnick. The podcast's first episode, titled "Baghdadi and Blackouts", was released on October 28, 2019. What a Day won a Webby Award as the People's Voice Winner of "Best News & Politics Podcast" in 2021. The 412th episode of What a Day⁠—released on July 30, 2021, and titled "Keeping The DREAM Alive"⁠—was Hughes' final episode as co-host of the podcast.

Personal life 
Hughes was diagnosed with benign liver tumors in 2015, an illness for which she had surgery in July 2016. Using the crowdfunding website GoFundMe, she raised nearly $40,000, which covered 60% of the costs related to her surgery.

Filmography

References

External links
 
 
 
 
 

1989 births
American women comedians
Living people
American YouTubers
People from Florence, Kentucky
Crooked Media
21st-century American women